The 2013–14 Pac-12 Conference men's basketball season begins with practices in October 2013 and ends with the 2014 Pac-12 Conference men's basketball tournament on March 15, 2014 at the MGM Grand Garden Arena in Paradise, Nevada. The regular season began on the first weekend of November 2013, with the conference schedule started in December 2013.

This is the third season under the Pac-12 Conference name and the 55th since the conference was established under its current charter as the Athletic Association of Western Universities in 1959. Including the history of the Pacific Coast Conference, which operated from 1915 to 1959 and is considered by the Pac-12 as a part of its own history, this is the Pac-12's 99th season of men's basketball.

Pre-season
 October 17, 2013 – Pac-12 Men's Basketball Media Day, Pac-12 Networks Studios, San Francisco, Calif.

Men’s Basketball Media Poll

Rankings

Conference Schedule

Composite Matrix
This table summarizes the head-to-head results between teams in conference play.

Conference tournament

The conference tournament is scheduled for Wednesday–Saturday, March 12–15, 2014 at the MGM Grand Garden Arena, Paradise, Nevada. Arizona and UCLA were seeded one and two respectively. The top four teams had a bye on the first day, March 12. Teams were seeded by conference record, with ties broken by record between the tied teams followed by record against the regular-season champion, if necessary.

Head coaches

Sean Miller, Arizona
Herb Sendek, Arizona State
Mike Montgomery, California
Tad Boyle, Colorado
Dana Altman, Oregon
Craig Robinson, Oregon State
Johnny Dawkins, Stanford
Steve Alford, UCLA
 Andy Enfield, USC
Larry Krystkowiak, Utah
Lorenzo Romar, Washington
Ken Bone, Washington State

Post season

NCAA tournament

National Invitation tournament 

{| class="sortable wikitable" style="white-space:nowrap; font-size:90%;"
|-
! Seed
! Bracket
! School
! First Round
! Second Round
! Quarterfinals
! Semifinals
! Finals
|-
| 2
| SMU
| California
| style="background:#bfb;"|#7 Utah Valley - Mar. 19, Berkeley - W, 77–64
| style="background:#bfb;"|#3 Arkansas - Mar. 24, Berkeley - W, 75-64
| style="background:#fbb;"|#1 SMU -  Mar. 26, Dallas- L, 65–67
| style="background:#fff;"|
| style="background:#fff;"|
|-	 	 			 	 	 			 	 	 			
| 5
| Minnesota
| Utah|  style="background:#fbb;"|#4 Saint Mary's - Mar. 18, Moraga - L, 58–70| style="background:#fff;"|
| style="background:#fff;"|
| style="background:#fff;"|
| style="background:#fff;"|
|-
||
||2 Bids||W-L (%):||1–1 
||1–0 
||0–1 
||0–0 
||TOTAL: 2–2 
|}

 College Basketball Invitational 

Highlights and notes
 February 1, 2014 – Arizona's perfect season ended by California (58–60) at Haas Pavilion in Berkeley, CA.

Awards and honors
 The Pac-12 Coach of the Year Award in both men’s and women’s basketball is now known as the John Wooden Coach of the Year Award.

Scholar-Athlete of the Year
Dwight Powell, Sr., Stanford

Player-of-the-Week

Nov. 11 – Tyrone Wallace, So., California
Nov. 18  – Roberto Nelson, Sr., Oregon State
Nov. 25 – Jahii Carson, So., Arizona State
Dec. 2 – Nick Johnson, Jr., Arizona
Dec. 9 – Askia Booker, Jr., Colorado
Dec. 16 – Jordan Loveridge, So., Utah
Dec. 23 – Chasson Randle, Jr., Stanford
Dec. 30  – Roberto Nelson, Sr., Oregon State (2)
Jan. 6 – Askia Booker, Jr., Colorado (2)
Jan. 13 – Justin Cobbs, Sr., California
Jan. 20 – Delon Wright, Jr., Utah
Jan. 27 – Kyle Anderson, So. UCLA
Feb. 3 – Justin Cobbs, Sr., California (2)
Feb. 10 – Jordan Bachynski, Sr., Arizona State
Feb. 17 – Jermaine Marshall, Sr., Arizona State
Feb. 24 – Josh Huestis, Sr., Stanford
Mar. 3 – Mike Moser, Sr., Oregon
Mar. 10 – Mike Moser, Sr., Oregon (2)

All-Americans

Nick Johnson, Arizona, Consensus first team
Kyle Anderson, UCLA, Third team (Associated Press, Sporting News)
Aaron Gordon, Arizona, Third team (Sporting News)

All-Pac-12 teams

Voting was by conference coaches:
Player of The Year: Nick Johnson, Arizona
Freshman of The Year: Aaron Gordon, Arizona
Defensive Player of The Year: Jordan Bachynski, Arizona State
Most Improved Player of The Year: Anthony Brown, Stanford
John R. Wooden Coach of the Year: Sean Miller, Arizona

First Team

Pac-12 All-Freshman Team

Pac-12 All-Defensive Team

All-Academic
First Team:

Second Team:

USBWA All-District teamDistrict VIIIDistrict IX Player of The Year: Nick Johnson, Arizona
 Coach of The Year: Sean Miller, Arizona

NABC All District TeamDistrict 20'''
First Team 
Nick Johnson, Arizona 
Kyle Anderson, UCLA
Justin Cobbs, CAL 
Jordan Adams, UCLA
C. J. Wilcox, WASH

Second Team 
Dwight Powell, Stanford
Jahii Carson, Arizona State
Delon Wright, Utah
Aaron Gordon, Arizona
Chasson Randle, Stanford

NBA Draft

References

External links
2014–15 Pac-12 Men's Basketball Media Guide